Rory Harry John Jenkins (born 29 June 1970) is a former English cricketer.  Jenkins was a right-handed batsman who bowled right-arm medium pace.  He was born in Leicester and educated at Oundle and Downing College, Cambridge.

Jenkins made his first-class debut for Cambridge University against Northamptonshire at Fenner's.  In the year of his Cambridge University debut he also played for Devon in 4 Minor Counties Championship matches.  From 1990 to 1993, he represented the University in 18 first-class matches, the last of which came against Sussex at the County Ground, Hove.  In his 18 first-class matches he scored 123 runs at a batting average of 8.20, with a high score of 20.  With the ball he took 24 wickets at a bowling average of 70.29, with a single five wicket haul which gave him best figures of 5/100.

In 1991, he played 4 List A matches for Combined Universities in the 1991 Benson & Hedges Cup, making his List A debut against Gloucestershire and playing his List A match against Northamptonshire.  A bowler, Jenkins owing to back injury disappointed with the ball in the one-day format, claiming just a single wicket at an average of 141.00, with best figures of 1/58.
Jenkins played for the combined Oxbridge team against the West Indies in 1991 at The Parks taking three wickets.

References

 Oxford and Cambridge Universities v West Indians CricketArchive

External links
Rory Jenkins at Cricinfo
Rory Jenkins at CricketArchive

1970 births
Living people
Cricketers from Leicester
English cricketers
Cambridge University cricketers
Devon cricketers
British Universities cricketers